Hasna is a feminine given name meaning beauty. Notable people with this name include:

Hasna Begum (1935–2020), Bangladeshi philosopher and feminist
Hasna Benhassi (born 1978), Moroccan middle-distance runner
Hasna Barkat Daoud, Djiboutian lawyer and politician
Hasna Mohamed Dato (born 1959), Djiboutian politician
Hasna Doreh, Somalian commander
Hasna Hassan Ali, Djiboutian politician
Hasna Jasimuddin Moudud (born 1946), Bangladeshi writer and politician
M. Hasna Maznavi (born ), American writer and activist
Hasna Sal (born 1972), American glass sculptor
Hasna Xhukiçi (born 1988), Albanian model

Jamila. Hasna

dade also

References